Thomasia brachystachys is a species of flowering plant in the family Malvaceae and is endemic to the Southwest Australia south-west of Western Australia. It is an open, erect shrub with egg-shaped to heart-shaped leaves and pink to mauve flowers.

Description
The edges of the leaves are lobed, the lower surface covered with star-shaped hairs and the upper surface becoming glabrous with age. The sepals are pink to mauve, joined for about half their length and there are bracts and broadly elliptic bracteoles at the base. The petals are small and scale-like, the five stamens free from each other, and the style no longer than the petals. The fruit is a dehiscent capsule.

Taxonomy and naming
Thomasia brachystachys was first formally described in 1852 by Nikolai Turczaninow and the description was published in Bulletin de la Société Impériale des Naturalistes de Moscou. The specific epithet (brachystachys) means "a short flower spike".

Distribution and habitat
This thomasia grows in woodland and forest at higher altitudes in the Stirling Range National Park and near Gnowangerup.

Conservation status
Thomasia brachystachys is classified as "Priority Two" by the Western Australian Government Department of Biodiversity, Conservation and Attractions, meaning that it is poorly known and from only one or a few locations.

Use in horticulture
This thomasia is described as an attractive species that has proved reliable in a range of conditions when grown in well-drained, humus-rich soil. It can be propagated from both seed and cuttings and is moderately drought and frost hardy.

References

Rosids of Western Australia
Plants described in 1852
brachystachys
Taxa named by Nikolai Turczaninow